Khattab (also Romanized as Khaţţāb; also known as Khaţţāb-e Bālā) is a village in Ziarat Rural District, in the Central District of Shirvan County, North Khorasan Province, Iran. At the 2006 census, its population was 226, in 58 families.

References 

Populated places in Shirvan County